An-Sophie Mestach and Demi Schuurs were the defending champions but neither of them were eligible to participate in 2012.

American pair Gabrielle Andrews and Taylor Townsend won the title, defeating Irina Khromacheva and Danka Kovinić in the final, 5–7, 7–5, [10–6].

Seeds

Draw

Finals

Top half

Bottom half

External links 
 Main draw

Girls' Doubles
Australian Open, 2012 Girls' Doubles